Qods (Malek Shahr) Metro Station is a station on Isfahan Metro Line 1. The station opened on 15 October 2015. It is located near Imam Khomeini Expressway at Shahrak-e Kowsar and Shahrak-e Qods neighbourhoods at Asheghabad area. It is the northern terminus of Line 1 of Isfahan metro. The next station is Baharestan Station.

References

Isfahan Metro stations
Railway stations opened in 2015